The 35th United States Congress was a meeting of the legislative branch of the United States federal government, consisting of the United States Senate and the United States House of Representatives. It met in Washington, D.C. from March 4, 1857, to March 4, 1859, during the first two years of James Buchanan's presidency. The apportionment of seats in the House of Representatives was based on the 1850 United States census. Both chambers had a Democratic majority.

Major events

 Panic of 1857
 March 4, 1857. James Buchanan became President of the United States
 March 6, 1857: Dred Scott v. Sandford
 July 18, 1857: Utah Expedition left Fort Leavenworth, effectively beginning the Utah War
 August 21, 1858: First of the Lincoln-Douglas debates was held
 March 3, 1859: Financial appropriations for the improvement and construction of lighthouses.

Major legislation

Treaties 

 March 12, 1858: Treaty with the Ponca signed
 April 19, 1858: Treaty with the Yankton Sioux signed
 July 29, 1858: Harris Treaty signed with Japan

States admitted 
 May 11, 1858: Minnesota admitted as the 32nd state
 February 14, 1859: Oregon admitted as the 33rd state

Party summary

Senate 

During this congress, two Senate seats were added for each of the new states of Minnesota and Oregon.

House of Representatives
During this congress, two House seats were added for the new state of Minnesota and one House seat was added for the new state of Oregon.

Leadership

Senate 

 President: John C. Breckinridge (D)
 President pro tempore: James M. Mason (D), March 4, 1857, only
 Thomas J. Rusk (D), elected March 14, 1857
 Benjamin Fitzpatrick (D), elected December 7, 1857

House of Representatives 
 Speaker: James L. Orr (D)

Members
This list is arranged by chamber, then by state. Senators are listed in order of seniority, and representatives are listed by district.

Senate
Senators were elected by the state legislatures every two years, with one-third beginning new six-year terms with each Congress. Preceding the names in the list below are Senate class numbers, which indicate the cycle of their election. In this Congress, Class 1 meant their term began with this Congress, facing re-election in 1862; Class 2 meant their term ended with this Congress, facing re-election in 1858; and Class 3 meant their term began in the last Congress, facing re-election in 1860.

Alabama 
 3. Benjamin Fitzpatrick (D)
 2. Clement C. Clay Jr. (D)

Arkansas 
 2. William K. Sebastian (D)
 3. Robert W. Johnson (D)

California 
 1. David C. Broderick (D)
 3. William M. Gwin (D)

Connecticut 
 1. James Dixon (R)
 3. La Fayette S. Foster (R)

Delaware 
 1. James A. Bayard Jr. (D)
 2. Martin W. Bates (D)

Florida 
 1. Stephen Mallory (D)
 3. David Levy Yulee (D)

Georgia 
 2. Robert Toombs (D)
 3. Alfred Iverson Sr. (D)

Illinois 
 2. Stephen A. Douglas (D)
 3. Lyman Trumbull (R)

Indiana 
 1. Jesse D. Bright (D)
 3. Graham N. Fitch (D)

Iowa 
 2. George Wallace Jones (D)
 3. James Harlan (R)

Kentucky 
 2. John B. Thompson (A)
 3. John J. Crittenden (A)

Louisiana 
 2. Judah P. Benjamin (D)
 3. John Slidell (D)

Maine 
 1. Hannibal Hamlin (R)
 2. William Pitt Fessenden (R)

Maryland 
 1. Anthony Kennedy (A)
 3. James Pearce (D)

Massachusetts 
 1. Charles Sumner (R)
 2. Henry Wilson (R)

Michigan 
 1. Zachariah Chandler (R)
 2. Charles E. Stuart (D)

Minnesota 
 1. Henry M. Rice (D), from May 11, 1858 (newly admitted state)
 2. James Shields (D), from May 11, 1858 (newly admitted state)

Mississippi 
 1. Jefferson Davis (D)
 2. Albert G. Brown (D)

Missouri 
 1. Trusten Polk (D)
 3. James S. Green (D)

New Hampshire 
 2. John P. Hale (R)
 3. James Bell (R), until May 26, 1857
 Daniel Clark (R), from June 27, 1857

New Jersey 
 1. John R. Thomson (D)
 2. William Wright (D)

New York 
 1. Preston King (R)
 3. William H. Seward (R)

North Carolina 
 2. David S. Reid (D)
 3. Asa Biggs (D), until May 5, 1858
 Thomas L. Clingman (D), from May 7, 1858

Ohio 
 1. Benjamin Wade (R)
 3. George E. Pugh (D)

Oregon 
 2. Delazon Smith (D), from February 14, 1859 (newly admitted state)
 3. Joseph Lane (D), from February 14, 1859 (newly admitted state)

Pennsylvania 
 1. Simon Cameron (R)
 3. William Bigler (D)

Rhode Island 
 1. James F. Simmons (R)
 2. Philip Allen (D)

South Carolina 
 2. Josiah J. Evans (D), until May 6, 1858
 Arthur P. Hayne (D), from May 11, 1858, until December 2, 1858
 James Chesnut Jr. (D), from December 3, 1858
 3. Andrew Butler (D), until May 25, 1857
 James H. Hammond (D), from December 7, 1857

Tennessee 
 1. Andrew Johnson (D), from October 8, 1857
 2. John Bell (A)

Texas 
 1. Thomas J. Rusk (D), until July 29, 1857
 J. Pinckney Henderson (D), November 9, 1857 - June 4, 1858
 Matthias Ward (D), from September 27, 1858
 2. Samuel Houston (D)

Vermont 
 1. Solomon Foot (R)
 3. Jacob Collamer (R)

Virginia 
 1. James M. Mason (D)
 2. Robert M. T. Hunter (D)

Wisconsin 
 1. James R. Doolittle (R)
 3. Charles Durkee (R)

House of Representatives
The names of members of the House of Representatives are preceded by their district numbers.

Alabama 
 . James A. Stallworth (D)
 . Eli S. Shorter (D)
 . James F. Dowdell (D)
 . Sydenham Moore (D)
 . George S. Houston (D)
 . Williamson R. W. Cobb (D)
 . Jabez L. M. Curry (D)

Arkansas 
 . Alfred B. Greenwood (D)
 . Edward A. Warren (D)

California 
 . Joseph C. McKibbin (D)
 . Charles L. Scott (D)

Connecticut 
 . Ezra Clark Jr. (R)
 . Samuel Arnold (D)
 . Sidney Dean (R)
 . William D. Bishop (D)

Delaware 
 . William G. Whiteley (D)

Florida 
 . George S. Hawkins (D)

Georgia 
 . James L. Seward (D)
 . Martin J. Crawford (D)
 . Robert P. Trippe (A)
 . Lucius J. Gartrell (D)
 . Augustus R. Wright (D)
 . James Jackson (D)
 . Joshua Hill (A)
 . Alexander H. Stephens (D)

Illinois 
 . Elihu B. Washburne (R)
 . John F. Farnsworth (R)
 . Owen Lovejoy (R)
 . William Kellogg (R)
 . Isaac N. Morris (D)
 . Thomas L. Harris (D), until November 24, 1858
 Charles D. Hodges (D), from January 4, 1859
 . Aaron Shaw (D)
 . Robert Smith (D)
 . Samuel S. Marshall (D)

Indiana 
 . James Lockhart (D), until September 7, 1857 
 William E. Niblack (D), from December 7, 1857
 . William H. English (D)
 . James Hughes (D)
 . James B. Foley (D)
 . David Kilgore (R)
 . James M. Gregg (D)
 . John G. Davis (D)
 . James Wilson (R)
 . Schuyler Colfax (R)
 . Samuel Brenton (R), until March 29, 1857
 Charles Case (R), from December 7, 1857
 . John U. Pettit (R)

Iowa 
 . Samuel Curtis (R)
 . Timothy Davis (R)

Kentucky 
 . Henry C. Burnett (D)
 . Samuel O. Peyton (D)
 . Warner L. Underwood (A)
 . Albert G. Talbott (D)
 . Joshua Jewett (D)
 . John M. Elliott (D)
 . Humphrey Marshall (A)
 . James B. Clay (D)
 . John C. Mason (D)
 . John W. Stevenson (D)

Louisiana 
 . George Eustis Jr. (A)
 . Miles Taylor (D)
 . Thomas G. Davidson (D)
 . John M. Sandidge (D)

Maine 
 . John M. Wood (R)
 . Charles J. Gilman (R)
 . Nehemiah Abbott (R)
 . Freeman H. Morse (R)
 . Israel Washburn Jr. (R)
 . Stephen C. Foster (R)

Maryland 
 . James A. Stewart (D)
 . James B. Ricaud (A)
 . J. Morrison Harris (A)
 . Henry Winter Davis (A)
 . Jacob M. Kunkel (D)
 . Thomas F. Bowie (D)

Massachusetts 
 . Robert B. Hall (R)
 . James Buffington (R)
 . William S. Damrell (R)
 . Linus B. Comins (R)
 . Anson Burlingame (R)
 . Timothy Davis (R)
 . Nathaniel P. Banks (R), until December 24, 1857
 Daniel W. Gooch (R), from January 31, 1858
 . Chauncey L. Knapp (R)
 . Eli Thayer (R)
 . Calvin C. Chaffee (R)
 . Henry L. Dawes (R)

Michigan 
 . William A. Howard (R)
 . Henry Waldron (R)
 . David S. Walbridge (R)
 . De Witt C. Leach (R)

Minnesota 
 . James M. Cavanaugh (D), from May 11, 1858 (newly admitted state)
 . William W. Phelps (D), from May 11, 1858 (newly admitted state)

Mississippi 
 . Lucius Q. C. Lamar (D)
 . Reuben Davis (D)
 . William Barksdale (D)
 . Otho R. Singleton (D)
 . John A. Quitman (D), until July 17, 1858
 John J. McRae (D), from December 7, 1858

Missouri 
 . Francis P. Blair Jr. (R)
 . Thomas L. Anderson (A)
 . John B. Clark (D), from December 7, 1857
 . James Craig (D)
 . Samuel H. Woodson (A)
 . John S. Phelps (D)
 . Samuel Caruthers (D)

New Hampshire 
 . James Pike (R)
 . Mason Tappan (R)
 . Aaron H. Cragin (R)

New Jersey 
 . Isaiah D. Clawson (R)
 . George R. Robbins (R)
 . Garnett Adrain (D)
 . John Huyler (D)
 . Jacob R. Wortendyke (D)

New York 
 . John A. Searing (D)
 . George Taylor (D)
 . Daniel Sickles (D)
 . John Kelly (D), until December 25, 1858
 Thomas J. Barr (ID), from January 7, 1859
 . William B. Maclay (D)
 . John Cochrane (D)
 . Elijah Ward (D)
 . Horace F. Clark (D)
 . John B. Haskin (D)
 . Ambrose S. Murray (R)
 . William F. Russell (D)
 . John Thompson (R)
 . Abram B. Olin (R)
 . Erastus Corning (D)
 . Edward Dodd (R)
 . George W. Palmer (R)
 . Francis E. Spinner (R)
 . Clark B. Cochrane (R)
 . Oliver A. Morse (R)
 . Orsamus B. Matteson (R)
 . Henry Bennett (R)
 . Henry C. Goodwin (R)
 . Charles B. Hoard (R)
 . Amos P. Granger (R)
 . Edwin B. Morgan (R)
 . Emory B. Pottle (R)
 . John M. Parker (R)
 . William H. Kelsey (R)
 . Samuel G. Andrews (R)
 . Judson W. Sherman (R)
 . Silas M. Burroughs (R)
 . Israel T. Hatch (D)
 . Reuben Fenton (R)

North Carolina 
 . Henry M. Shaw (D)
 . Thomas H. Ruffin (D)
 . Warren Winslow (D)
 . Lawrence O'Bryan Branch (D)
 . John A. Gilmer (A)
 . Alfred M. Scales (D)
 . F. Burton Craige (D)
 . Thomas L. Clingman (D), until May 7, 1858
 Zebulon B. Vance (D), from December 7, 1858

Ohio 
 . George H. Pendleton (D)
 . William S. Groesbeck (D)
 . Lewis D. Campbell (R), until May 25, 1858
 Clement Vallandigham (D), from May 25, 1858
 . Matthias H. Nichols (R)
 . Richard Mott (R)
 . Joseph R. Cockerill (D)
 . Aaron Harlan (R)
 . Benjamin Stanton (R)
 . Lawrence W. Hall (D)
 . Joseph Miller (D)
 . Valentine B. Horton (R)
 . Samuel S. Cox (D)
 . John Sherman (R)
 . Philemon Bliss (R)
 . Joseph Burns (D)
 . Cydnor B. Tompkins (R)
 . William Lawrence (D)
 . Benjamin F. Leiter (R)
 . Edward Wade (R)
 . Joshua R. Giddings (R)
 . John Bingham (R)

Oregon 
 . La Fayette Grover (D), from February 14, 1859 (newly admitted state)

Pennsylvania 
 . Thomas B. Florence (D)
 . Edward Joy Morris (R)
 . James Landy (D)
 . Henry M. Phillips (D)
 . Owen Jones (D)
 . John Hickman (D)
 . Henry Chapman (D)
 . J. Glancey Jones (D), until October 30, 1858 
 William H. Keim (R), from December 7, 1858
 . Anthony E. Roberts (R)
 . John C. Kunkel (R)
 . William L. Dewart (D)
 . John G. Montgomery (D), until April 24, 1857
 Paul Leidy (D), from December 7, 1857
 . William H. Dimmick (D)
 . Galusha A. Grow (R)
 . Allison White (D)
 . John A. Ahl (D)
 . Wilson Reilly (D)
 . John R. Edie (R)
 . John Covode (R)
 . William Montgomery (D)
 . David Ritchie (R)
 . Samuel A. Purviance (R)
 . William Stewart (R)
 . James L. Gillis (D)
 . John Dick (R)

Rhode Island 
 . Nathaniel B. Durfee (R)
 . William D. Brayton (R)

South Carolina 
 . John McQueen (D)
 . William P. Miles (D)
 . Laurence M. Keitt (D)
 . Milledge L. Bonham (D)
 . James L. Orr (D)
 . William W. Boyce (D)

Tennessee 
 . Albert G. Watkins (D)
 . Horace Maynard (A)
 . Samuel A. Smith (D)
 . John H. Savage (D)
 . Charles Ready (A)
 . George W. Jones (D)
 . John V. Wright (D)
 . Felix K. Zollicoffer (A)
 . John D. C. Atkins (D)
 . William T. Avery (D)

Texas 
 . John H. Reagan (D)
 . Guy M. Bryan (D)

Vermont 
 . Eliakim P. Walton (R)
 . Justin S. Morrill (R)
 . Homer E. Royce (R)

Virginia 
 . Muscoe R. H. Garnett (D)
 . John S. Millson (D)
 . John Caskie (D)
 . William Goode (D)
 . Thomas S. Bocock (D)
 . Paulus Powell (D)
 . William Smith (D)
 . Charles J. Faulkner (D)
 . John Letcher (D)
 . Sherrard Clemens (D)
 . Albert G. Jenkins (D)
 . Henry A. Edmundson (D)
 . George W. Hopkins (D)

Wisconsin 
 . John F. Potter (R)
 . Cadwallader C. Washburn (R)
 . Charles Billinghurst (R)

Non-voting members
 . Marcus J. Parrott (R)
 . William W. Kingsbury (D), until May 11, 1858
 . Fenner Ferguson (D)
 . Miguel A. Otero (D)
 . Joseph Lane (D), until February 14, 1859
 . John M. Bernhisel
 . Isaac Stevens (D)

Changes in membership
The count below reflects changes from the beginning of the first session of this Congress.

Senate 

 Replacements: 5
 Democrats (D): no net change
 Whigs (W): no net change
 Republicans (R): no net change
 Americans (A): no net change
 Deaths: 4
 Resignations: 1
 Interim appointments: 2
 Seats of newly admitted states: 4
 Total seats with changes: 9

|-
| Tennessee(1)
| Vacant
| Legislature had failed to elect.Successor elected October 8, 1857.
|  | Andrew Johnson (D)
| October 8, 1857

|-
| South Carolina(3)
|  | Andrew Butler (D)
| Died May 25, 1857.Successor elected December 7, 1857.
|  | James H. Hammond (D)
| December 7, 1857

|-
| New Hampshire(3)
|  | James Bell (R)
| Died May 26, 1857.Successor elected June 27, 1857.
|  | Daniel Clark (R)
| June 27, 1857

|-
| Texas(1)
|  | Thomas J. Rusk (D)
| Died July 29, 1857.Successor appointed November 9, 1857.
|  | J. Pinckney Henderson (D)
| November 9, 1857

|-
| North Carolina(3)
|  | Asa Biggs (D)
| Resigned May 5, 1858, to become judge of the U.S. District Court for the District of North Carolina.Successor appointed May 7, 1858.Appointee elected November 23, 1858.
|  | Thomas L. Clingman (D)
| May 7, 1858

|-
| South Carolina(2)
|  | Josiah J. Evans (D)
| Died May 6, 1858.Successor appointed May 11, 1858.
|  | Arthur P. Hayne (D)
| May 11, 1858

|-
| Minnesota(1)
| New seat
| Minnesota admitted to the Union May 11, 1858, and its first Senators were elected that day.
|  | Henry M. Rice (D)
| May 11, 1858

|-
| Minnesota(2)
| New seat
| Minnesota admitted to the Union May 11, 1858, and its first Senators were elected that day.
|  | James Shields (D)
| May 11, 1858

|-
| Texas(1)
|  | J. Pinckney Henderson (D)
| Died June 4, 1858.Successor appointed September 27, 1858.
|  | Matthias Ward (D)
| September 27, 1858

|-
| South Carolina(2)
|  | Arthur P. Hayne (D)
| Interim appointee retired.Successor elected  December 2, 1858.
|  | James Chesnut Jr. (D)
| December 3, 1858

|-
| Oregon(2)
| New seat
| Oregon admitted to the Union February 14, 1859, and its first Senators were elected that day.
|  | Delazon Smith (D)
| February 14, 1859

|-
| Oregon(3)
| New seat
| Oregon admitted to the Union February 14, 1859, and its first Senators were elected that day.
|  | Joseph Lane (D)
| February 14, 1859
|}

House of Representatives 

 Replacements: 10
 Democrats (D): 3 seat net loss
 Whigs (W): 3 seat net gain
 Republicans (R): 1 seat net gain
 Independent Democrats (ID): 1 seat net gain
 Deaths: 5
 Resignations: 6
 Contested election:1
 Seats of newly admitted states: 3
 Total seats with changes: 14

|-
| 
| Vacant
| style="font-size:80%" | Rep. James S. Green was elected to this term but resigned after being elected in turn to the US Senate
|  | John B. Clark (D)
| Seated December 7, 1857
|-
| 
|  | Samuel Brenton (R)
| style="font-size:80%" | Died March 29, 1857
|  | Charles Case (R)
| Seated December 7, 1857
|-
| 
|  | John G. Montgomery (D)
| style="font-size:80%" | Died April 24, 1857
|  | Paul Leidy (D)
| Seated December 7, 1857
|-
| 
|  | James Lockhart (D)
| style="font-size:80%" | Died September 7, 1857
|  | William E. Niblack (D)
| Seated December 7, 1857
|-
| 
|  | Nathaniel P. Banks (R)
| style="font-size:80%" | Resigned December 24, 1857, after being elected Governor of Massachusetts
|  | Daniel W. Gooch (R)
| Seated January 31, 1858
|-
| 
|  | Thomas L. Clingman (D)
| style="font-size:80%" | Resigned May 7, 1858, after being appointed to the US Senate
|  | Zebulon B. Vance (D)
| Seated December 7, 1858
|-
| 
| New seat
| style="font-size:80%" | Minnesota was admitted to the Union May 11, 1858
|  | James M. Cavanaugh (D)
| Seated May 11, 1858
|-
| 
|  | William W. Kingsbury (D)
| style="font-size:80%" | Minnesota was admitted to the Union May 11, 1858
| colspan=2 | Seat eliminated  
|-
| 
| New seat
| style="font-size:80%" | Minnesota was admitted to the Union May 11, 1858
|  | William W. Phelps (D)
| Seated May 11, 1858
|-
| 
|  | Lewis D. Campbell (R)
| style="font-size:80%" | Lost contested election May 25, 1858
|  | Clement Vallandigham (D)
| Seated May 25, 1858
|-
| 
|  | John A. Quitman (D)
| style="font-size:80%" | Died July 17, 1858
|  | John J. McRae (D)
| Seated December 7, 1858
|-
| 
|  | J. Glancy Jones (D)
| style="font-size:80%" | Resigned October 30, 1858
|  | William H. Keim (R)
| Seated December 7, 1858
|-
| 
|  | Thomas L. Harris (D)
| style="font-size:80%" | Died November 24, 1858
|  | Charles D. Hodges (D)
| Seated January 4, 1859
|-
| 
|  | John Kelly (D)
| style="font-size:80%" | Resigned December 25, 1858
|  | Thomas J. Barr (D)
| Seated January 7, 1859
|-
| 
|  | Joseph Lane (D)
| style="font-size:80%" | Oregon was admitted to the Union February 14, 1859
| colspan=2 | Seat eliminated
|-
| 
| New seat
| style="font-size:80%" | Oregon was admitted to the Union February 14, 1859
|  | La Fayette Grover (D)
| Seated February 14, 1859
|}

Committees
Lists of committees and their party leaders.

Senate

 Audit and Control the Contingent Expenses of the Senate (Chairman: Josiah J. Evans then William Wright)
 Banks of the District of Columbia (Select)
 Claims (Chairman: Alfred Iverson Sr.)
 Commerce (Chairman: Clement Claiborne Clay)
 Distributing Public Revenue Among the States (Select)
 District of Columbia (Chairman: Albert G. Brown)
 Engrossed Bills (Chairman: William Wright)
 Finance (Chairman: Robert M.T. Hunter)
 Foreign Relations (Chairman: James M. Mason) 
 French Spoilations (Select)
 Indian Affairs (Chairman: William K. Sebastian)
 Judiciary (Chairman: James A. Bayard Jr.)
 Military Affairs (Chairman: Jefferson Davis)
 Military Asylum near Washington, D.C. (Select)
 Militia (Chairman: N/A)
 Naval Affairs (Chairman: Stephen Mallory)
 Ordnance and War Ships (Select)
 Pacific Railroad (Select)
 Patents and the Patent Office (Chairman: David S. Reid)
 Pensions (Chairman: George Wallace Jones)
 Post Office and Post Roads (Chairman: David Levy Yulee)
 Printing (Chairman: Robert W. Johnson)
 Private Land Claims (Chairman: Judah P. Benjamin)
 Public Buildings and Grounds (Chairman: Jesse D. Bright)
 Public Lands (Chairman: Charles E. Stuart)
 Retrenchment (Chairman: Stephen A. Douglas)
 Revolutionary Claims (Chairman: Josiah J. Evans)
 Tariff Regulation (Select)
 Territories (Chairman: N/A)
 Whole

House of Representatives

 Accounts (Chairman: John C. Mason)
 Agriculture (Chairman: William G. Whiteley)
 Claims (Chairman: Samuel S. Marshall)
 Commerce (Chairman: John Cochrane)
 District of Columbia (Chairman: William O. Goode)
 Elections (Chairman: Thomas L. Harris)
 Engraving (Chairman: Garnett B. Adrain)
 Expenditures in the Navy Department (Chairman: John B. Haskin)
 Expenditures in the Post Office Department (Chairman: Albert G. Talbott)
 Expenditures in the State Department (Chairman: Owen Jones)
 Expenditures in the Treasury Department (Chairman: William Lawrence)
 Expenditures in the War Department (Chairman: Wilson Reilly)
 Expenditures on Public Buildings (Chairman: Allison White)
 Foreign Affairs (Chairman: Thomas L. Clingman)
 Indian Affairs (Chairman: Alfred B. Greenwood)
 Invalid Pensions (Chairman: Joshua H. Jewett)
 Judiciary (Chairman: George S. Houston) 
 Manufactures (Chairman: William D. Bishop)
 Mileage (Chairman: Robert Smith)
 Military Affairs (Chairman: John A. Quitman)
 Militia (Chairman: Israel T. Hatch)
 Naval Affairs (Chairman: Thomas S. Bocock)
 Patents (Chairman: James A. Stewart)
 Post Office and Post Roads (Chairman: William H. English)
 Private Land Claims (Chairman: John M. Sandidge)
 Public Buildings and Grounds (Chairman: Lawrence M. Keitt)
 Public Expenditures (Chairman: John M. Elliott)
 Public Lands (Chairman: Williamson R. W. Cobb)
 Revisal and Unfinished Business (Chairman: William L. Dewart)
 Revolutionary Claims (Chairman: Samuel S. Cox)
 Revolutionary Pensions (Chairman: John Hickman)
 Roads and Canals (Chairman: George W. Jones)
 Rules (Select)
 Standards of Official Conduct
 Territories (Chairman: Alexander H. Stephens)
 Ways and Means (Chairman: J. Glancy Jones then John S. Phelps)
 Whole

Joint committees

 Enrolled Bills (Chairman: Rep. Thomas G. Davidson)
 The Library (Chairman: Rep. William H. Dimmick)
 Printing (Chairman: Rep. Samuel A. Smith)

Caucuses 
 Democratic (House)
 Democratic (Senate)

Employees

Legislative branch agency directors 
 Architect of the Capitol. Thomas U. Walter
 Librarian of Congress: John Silva Meehan

Senate 
 Chaplain. Stephen P. Hill (Baptist)
 Secretary. Asbury Dickins 
 Sergeant at Arms. Dunning R. McNair

House of Representatives 
 Chaplain: None
 Clerk: James C. Allen
 Doorkeeper: Robert B. Hackney, until May 17, 1858
 Joseph L. Wright, elected May 18, 1858
 Messenger: Thaddeus Morrice
 Sergeant at Arms: Adam J. Glossbrenner
 Postmaster: Michael W. Cluskey
 Reading Clerks:

See also 
 1856 United States elections (elections leading to this Congress)
 1856 United States presidential election
 1856–57 United States Senate elections
 1856–57 United States House of Representatives elections
 1858 United States elections (elections during this Congress, leading to the next Congress)
 1858–59 United States Senate elections
 1858–59 United States House of Representatives elections

Notes

References
Specific citations

General references

External links
 Statutes at Large, 1789-1875
 Senate Journal, First Forty-three Sessions of Congress
 House Journal, First Forty-three Sessions of Congress
 Biographical Directory of the U.S. Congress
 U.S. House of Representatives: House History
 U.S. Senate: Statistics and Lists